The Bebrava is a river in western Slovakia. It rises in the Strážovské vrchy mountains near the village of Čierna Lehota, flowing at first south-west, turning after some 10 km into south, flowing through Bánovce nad Bebravou, finally pouring into the river Nitra near Topoľčany.

References

Rivers of Slovakia